Sarai Mir is a town and a nagar panchayat in Azamgarh district in the Indian state of Uttar Pradesh.

Demographics
As per the 2011 Indian Census, Sarai Mir had a total population of 19,055, of which 9,760 were males and 9,295 were females. Population within the age group of 0 to 6 years was 3,040. The total number of literates in Sarai Mir was 13,151, which constituted 69.0% of the population with male literacy of 72.8% and female literacy of 65.1%. The effective literacy rate of 7+ population of Sarai Mir was 82.1%, of which male literacy rate was 86.6% and female literacy rate was 77.4%. The Scheduled Castes and Scheduled Tribes population was 2,740 and 13 respectively. Sarai Mir had 2,384 households in 2011.

 India census, Saraimir had a population of 15,526. Males constitute 51% of the population and females 49%. Saraimir has an average literacy rate of 58%, lower than the national average of 59.5%: male literacy is 64%, and female literacy is 52%. In Saraimir, 21% of the population is under 6 years of age.

Religion

Islam is followed by a little more than half of the population, while almost all of the remaining population follow Hinduism.

Education
Madrasatul Islah, a traditional Islamic institution of learning found in 1908

References

Cities and towns in Azamgarh district
Caravanserais in India